Antoine-Girard de La Bournat (1656, Clermont - 8 March 1702) was a French cleric and a doctor at the Sorbonne.

He was put in charge of educating Louis Alexandre, Count of Toulouse by Louis XIV of France. He was already abbot of Pontlevoy Abbey when he was made bishop of Toul in 1697. He was also made bishop of Boulogne and bishop of Poitiers, both in 1698.

Sources
Eugène Van Drival, Histoire des évêques de Boulogne, Boulogne-sur-Mer, 1852

1656 births
1702 deaths
Bishops of Boulogne
Bishops of Toul
Bishops of Poitiers